Feminization or feminisation (see spelling differences), sometimes forced feminization (shortened to forcefem or forced femme), and also known as sissification, is a practice in dominance and submission or kink subcultures, involving reversal of gender roles and making a submissive male take on a feminine role, which includes cross-dressing. Subsets of the practice include "sissy training" and variations thereof, where the submissive male is "trained" to become feminine. 

Feminization as a sexual fetish is not the same thing as being a transgender woman, and the submissive partners engaging in it are typically heterosexual men. It has been speculated that the fetish is rooted in societal pressure for men to be traditionally masculine.

Practice

Feminization is a practice in dominance and submission or kink subcultures, which involves reversing gender roles, making a submissive partner – typically a man – take on a feminine role, often for humiliation-based sexual pleasure. This may include them cross-dressing in feminine clothing such as lingerie, acting in a feminine manner, getting referred to by a feminine name, having anal sex as the receptive partner, wearing prosthetic breasts, or tucking.

People participating in feminization often role-play different scenarios based around the submissive partner's femininity or feminine clothes; these may include role-playing being caught in the act of trying on panties or lipstick, being discovered to be wearing frilly lingerie under their clothes, being a princess, being a "damsel in distress" and treated like a helpless woman, or being hired "as a woman" for a female-coded job like a nurse, cheerleader, sex worker, or businesswoman. HuffPost described one dominatrix's sissification sessions as involving humiliating the submissive by "parading them around" in high heels, make-up, and lingerie; another dominatrix does her sessions by "cheerleading" men into exploring femininity.

Despite being labeled as "forced" feminization, as the role-played scenario may involve that the submissive partner supposedly is feminized against their will, it is a fantasy that is agreed upon by its participants. Whereas not all participants are interested in BDSM aspects of the practice, and only enjoy dressing up, it may also include things such as spanking, pegging, bondage, and humiliation such as making fun of the submissive for having a small and soft penis, and referring to it as a clitoris. The feminized partner is sometimes called a "sissy", and may be said to have been "sissified".

Sissy training and variations

A subset of feminization is "sissy training", wherein the dominant partner slowly over time trains the submissive in being a sissy, making them take on "ultra-feminine" behaviors and participate in feminine activities. As part of this, it is common for the sissy to cross-dress; to shave their body, including their genitals; wear make-up; and wear women's underwear, to appear more womanly. Activities in sissy training involve non-sexual ones, such as applying make-up or cleaning the house, as well as sexual ones.

A further sub-set is "sissy maid training", a common scenario, where the sissy takes on the role of a maid, taking care of housework or serving drinks and food at a party while behaving submissively and wearing an often frilly and revealing maid uniform, such as a French maid or rubber maid dress. The dominant partner in a sissy maid training scenario, overseeing the sissy's housework, may role-play punishing them with things such as spanking, humiliation or bondage, whether the infraction was real or made up; a reward for good behavior might be allowing the submissive to orgasm.

Another common sub-set is "slut training", where the submissive partner is made to wear "slutty" feminine clothing that may reveal a lot of bare skin and show off the submissive's curves, while being teased or chided for being promiscuous or overly sexual. The training involves making the submissive – who often may be shy and embarrassed – overcome those emotions, shifting their mindset so that they instinctively act more provocatively and uninhibitedly. The training may include training the submissive to pose provocatively, such as spreading their buttocks or exposing their genitals, and making them instinctively assume certain such positions in certain situations.

Society and culture
According to a HuffPost feature where sex workers were interviewed, including dominatrixes and escorts, forced feminization is one of the most common sexual fantasies among sex workers' clients: one dominatrix said that a vast majority of her clients want to be sissified. In Danielle J. Lindemann's Dominatrix, about a third of a sample of 305 sex worker clients were interested in being made to cross-dress. The fantasy is to a large degree practiced by heterosexual, cisgender men as the submissive partners, although Vice noted that there were also bisexual and pansexual men present at a feminization meet-up they reported on, as well as some genderfluid and transgender people. In slut training scenarios, the submissive partner is most commonly a woman. The dominant partner may likewise be of any gender; in sissy maid training scenarios, they are typically a woman.

Kinkly describes the appeal of feminization as coming from the societal pressure on men to be traditionally masculine, and how being feminine can give men a feeling of guilt. When a man who is drawn to femininity does things considered feminine as part of a scenario where he is supposedly "forced" to do them, this may provide an outlet for his feelings while also giving him a relief of the guilt, since it within the fantasy is an outside force that caused him to do it; because of the stigma, it may still be difficult for either partner to bring up the subject, however, not knowing how the other will react to it. Some people also use feminization as a way to explore their sexuality. As a BDSM role-play practice, being feminized may appeal to the submissive through making them feel vulnerable and reinforcing their role. Dominant partners may enjoy feminization for getting to bring their submissive partner's "female persona" out, or for getting to erotically humiliating them for their lack of masculinity.

In her book Fetish Sex, writer Violet Blue says that although the kink may seem like it is devaluing women from an outsider's perspective, submissive partners engaging in it often have a lot of respect for women. In Gender Reversals and Gender Cultures, Sabrina P. Ramet writes that although the fantasy may seem contradictory in its treatment of femininity as a source of humiliation, since it often is combined with femdom – as one could assume that the submissive's feminine clothing would be a symbol of the female superiority within a femdom–feminization role-play scenario – the two fantasies are independent even within the role-play, with the humiliation coming from the cultural taboo of wearing women's clothing as a man.

Visual artist Río Sofia created a series of self portraits in 2019 themed around forced feminization, influenced by the Forced Womanhood! magazine and sharing its name. Feminization was featured in an episode of the television drama series Law & Order: Criminal Intent, which was described as an unrealistic portrayal by author Helen Boyd in her book My Husband Betty. 

Feminization, as a sexual fetish, is very different from being a transgender woman; Ana Valens, writing for The Daily Dot, still describes forced feminization as a common fantasy among trans women, as the stigmatized need of trans women to be women, through feminization fantasies, can be met before a trans woman has admitted to having that need.

See also
Cuckoldry	
Male Chastity
Pinafore eroticism
Sissy

References

Further reading
 

BDSM terminology
Cross-dressing
Effeminacy
Femininity
Sexual fetishism
Sexual roleplay